The 1997 Central Asian Games also known as the II Central Asian Games were held in Alma-Ata, Kazakhstan in 1997.

Participating nations 
  Kazakhstan
  Kyrgyzstan
  Tajikistan
  Turkmenistan
  Uzbekistan

Sports

Medal table

References 

Central Asian Games
Central Asian Games, 1997
Central Asian Games, 1997
Central Asian Games
International sports competitions hosted by Kazakhstan
Multi-sport events in Kazakhstan
Sports competitions in Almaty